This is a list of the players who were on the rosters of the teams who participated in the 2000 Summer Olympics for Men's Basketball.

Group A

China

|}
| valign="top" |
 Head coach

Legend
(C) Team captain
nat field describes country of last club before the tournament
Age as of September 17, 2000
|}

France

|}
| valign="top" |
 Head coach

Legend
(C) Team captain
nat field describes country of last club before the tournament
Age as of September 17, 2000
|}

Italy

|}
| valign="top" |
 Head coach

Legend
(C) Team captain
nat field describes country of last club  before the tournament
Age as of September 17, 2000
|}

Lithuania

|}
| valign="top" |
 Head coach

Legend
(C) Team captain
nat field describes country of last club  before the tournament
Age as of September 17, 2000
|}

New Zealand

 
 

|}
| valign="top" |
 Head coach

Legend
(C) Team captain
nat field describes country of last club before the tournament
Age as of September 17, 2000
|}

United States

|}
| valign="top" |
 Head coach

Legend
(C) Team captain
nat field describes country of last club before the tournament
Age as of September 17, 2000
|}

Group B

Angola

 
 
 

|}
| valign="top" |
 Head coach

Legend
(C) Team captain
nat field describes country of last club  before the tournament
Age as of September 17, 2000
|}

Australia

|}
| valign="top" |
 Head coach

Legend
(C) Team captain
nat field describes country of last club before the tournament
Age as of September 17, 2000
|}

Canada

|}
| valign="top" |
 Head coach

Legend
(C) Team captain
nat field describes country of last club before the tournament
Age as of September 17, 2000
|}

Russia

|}
| valign="top" |
 Head coach

Legend
(C) Team captain
nat field describes country of last club before the tournament
Age as of September 17, 2000
|}

Spain

|}
| valign="top" |
 Head coach

Legend
(C) Team captain
nat field describes country of last club before the tournament
Age as of September 17, 2000
|}

FR Yugoslavia

|}
| valign="top" |
 Head coach

Legend
(C) Team captain
nat field describes country of last club before the tournament
Age as of September 17, 2000
|}

References
2000 Olympic Games: Tournament for Men FIBA Archive. Accessed June 10, 2011.

Rosters, Men
2000